Mount Acton  is at 3015 m, the dominant peak of the west ridge of the Welch Mountains in Palmer Land, West Antarctica. Argentina, Chile and United Kingdom claim this area.  Mapped by United States Geological Survey (USGS) in 1974. Named by Advisory Committee on Antarctic Names (US-ACAN) for Commander William Acton, U.S. Navy, operations officer on the staff of the commander, U.S. Naval Support Force, Antarctica, 1967–68, and executive officer, 1968–69.

References

Mountains of Palmer Land
Three-thousanders of Antarctica